Fairview Township is a township in Jefferson County, Kansas, USA.  As of the 2000 census, its population was 1,510.

Geography
Fairview Township covers an area of 34.79 square miles (90.1 square kilometers); of this, 7.72 square miles (20.01 square kilometers) or 22.21 percent is water. The streams of Evans Creek and Little Slough Creek run through this township.

Unincorporated towns
 Hilldale
 Hilldale South
 Lake Ridge
 Lakeside Village
 West Shore
(This list is based on USGS data and may include former settlements.)

Adjacent townships
 Ozawkie Township (north)
 Oskaloosa Township (east)
 Kentucky Township (south)
 Kaw Township (southwest)
 Rock Creek Township (west)

Cemeteries
The township contains one cemetery, Olive Branch.

References
 U.S. Board on Geographic Names (GNIS)
 United States Census Bureau cartographic boundary files

External links
 US-Counties.com
 City-Data.com

Townships in Jefferson County, Kansas
Townships in Kansas